Etix is an international web-based ticketing service provider for the entertainment, travel, and sports industries, processing over 50 million tickets per year in 40 countries.  Headquartered in Raleigh, North Carolina, and founded in 2000, Etix has offices in China, the Netherlands, Germany, Japan, Austria, Houston, Texas, Phoenix, Arizona, and Birmingham, Alabama.

Clients
 Venues such The Orange Peel (Asheville), Metro Chicago (Chicago, Il), and Fraze Pavilion (Kettering, OH).
 Performing arts centers and multi-use facilities such as Dallas Museum of Art, Cary Arts Center (Cary, NC) and The Landmark Theater (Richmond)
 Sport Arenas such as Kovalchick Convention and Athletic Complex (Indiana, Pennsylvania) and WesBanco Arena (Wheeling, West Virginia).
 Worldwide sports like Shanghai Formula 1
 NC State Fair

Acquisitions 
In January 2011 Etix acquired Rockhouse Partners, a digital marketing agency located in Nashville, TN. Rockhouse Partners provides marketing services to a variety of Etix venues as part of Etix Connect.

References 

Privately held companies based in North Carolina
Companies based in Raleigh, North Carolina
Entertainment companies established in 2000
Internet properties established in 2000
Ticket sales companies